Technopromexport is a Russian engineering company that builds energy facilities in Russia and abroad, including hydropower, thermal, geo-thermal and diesel power plants, power lines and electricity substations. The company was formed in 1955, and was transformed into a joint stock company in April 2006. The company's charter capital is 15.7 billion rubles.  The company is headquartered in Moscow.

The company is engaged in construction of turnkey power engineering facilities including hydro power plants, thermal power plants, geothermal power plant, and diesel power plants, power transmission lines, and substations. Also, the company is involved in modernization and reconstruction of the existing power engineering facilities, comprehensive post-warranty service of the power engineering facilities, equipment delivery, construction of industrial and infrastructural facilities, and production of thermal and electric energy. Technopromexport carries out works within the structure of the EPC/EPCM contracts.

History 
The company was founded in 1955.  It was specialized in construction of power engineering facilities under the programs of cooperation with the countries of socialist orientation. During these years, Technopromexport implemented more than 400 power engineering projects in 50 countries of the world, among them the Aswan Hydropower Complex (Egypt), the Euphrates Hydrocomplex (Syria), the Hòa Bình Dam hydroelectric power station (Vietnam), and others. Since 1993, the company is present in the Russian power engineering market.

In 2006, the legal form changed from federal state unitary enterprise to open joint stock company.  Since 2009, Technopromexport is a part of the Rostec state corporation.  Technopromexport stands as observer in Electric Power Council of the CIS countries.

By the end of 2011, the total value of projects implemented under the Technopromexport management has exceeded 80 billion rubles. The company's revenue in 2011 was 23.8 billion rubles, and the net profit reached 185.5 million rubles.

The company has a stake in Interautomatika, a joint venture with Siemens that the German group exited in July 2017.

Projects

Among the largest Russian projects implemented by the company are:
 2002 — construction of Mutnovskaya geothermal power plant.
 2006 — construction of two 450-MW CCGT units of North-Western TPP.
 2007 and 2012 — construction of two 325-MW CCGT units of Ivanovskie CCGT-325.
 2008 — construction of 121-MW CCGT power unit of Mezhdunarodnaya TPP.
 2010 — construction of 450-MW CCGT power unit of Kaliningradskaya TPP-2.
 2011 — construction of 450-MW CCGT power unit of Yuzhnaya TPP-22.

At the end of the year 2013, the company is implementing the following projects:
 Cherepetskaya PP (Russia) — construction on a turn-key basis of 2 coal power units, capacity 225 MW each.
 Nizhnevartovskaya PP (Russia) — construction on a turn-key basis of CCGT power unit of 400 MW
 HPP "Naglu" (Afghanistan) — modernization of the 94-MW hydroelectric power plant.
 TPP "Ghorazal" (Bangladesh) — reconstruction of the 55-MW power unit.
 TPP "Barh" (India) — construction of boiler island, 1980 MW.
 TPP "Harta" (Iraq) — restoration of two power units, 200 MW each.
 TPP "Sisak-3" (Croatia) — construction on a turn-key basis of the CCGT power unit of 230 MW.
 HPP "Polotskaya" (Belarus) — construction on a turn-key basis of the 22-MW hydroelectric power plant.
 TPP "Jijel" (Algeria) — repair of power units, equipment delivery.
 HPP "Kapanda" (Angola) — hydroelectric unit repair, equipment delivery, supervision.

Management 
Since 1955, the company was headed by:
 Gromov A.А. (1955-1956);
 Ivanov V.D. (1957-1958);
 Babarin E.I. (1958-1960);
 Golovanov V.S. (1960-1968);
 Maklakov A.C. (1968-1976);
 Smelyakov Yu.V. (1976-1983);
 Postovalov A.S. (1983-1990);
 Bokov S.М. (1990-1997);
 Kuznetsov V.A. (1998-2003);
 Molozhavy S.V. (2003-2009);
 Lukin A.A. (2009-2010);
 Kalanov A.B. (2010-2011);
 Isaev O.Y. (2011-2012);
 Minchenko U.V. (2012-2013);
 Topor-Gilka S.A. (2013-2020)

Since 2020, General Director of the company is Borodin Victor Nikolaevich.

References

External links
 Official site of the Company
 "Electric power" on a turn-key basis, TV plot

Technology companies established in 1955
Engineering companies of Russia
Rostec
Companies of the Soviet Union
Companies based in Moscow
Ministry of Foreign Trade (Soviet Union)
1955 establishments in Russia
Construction and civil engineering companies established in 1955